Broken Promises is the Allen Crane debut CD which features guitarist Mark Warner [] and veteran Cinderella drummer Fred Coury. []

Track listing
All tracks by Mark Warner

 "Broken Promises" – 4:35
 "She Came To Me" – 3:10
 "Hootie Hoo Hoo" – 4:10
 "Open Up Your Eyes" – 6:23
 "Feelin' Better" – 3:32

Personnel
 Mark Warner - acoustic guitars, electric guitars
 Glenn Ralph - vocals
 Steve Rossi - keyboards
 John Billings - bass
 Fred Coury - drums, percussion

Reviews 
Splendid Ezine, March 2001 review
 Strutter Magazine, April 2001 review

External links
Allen Crane website
Fred Coury website

References 
The Orchard Records, corporate release info
[ Fred Coury, Allmusic public discography, references Broken Promises EP]
[ Mark Warner, Allmusic public discography, references Broken Promises EP]
[ Glenn Ralph, Allmusic public discography, references Broken Promises EP]
[ Steve Rossi, Allmusic public discography, references Broken Promises EP]
[ John Billings, Allmusic public discography, references Broken Promises EP]
[ Voytek Kochanek, Allmusic public discography, references Broken Promises EP]

2000 EPs
Allen Crane albums